Kim Tae-ho (born 21 August 1962) was the prime minister-designate of South Korea who was appointed in a reshuffle that replaced seven other ministers. He stepped down as nominee amid growing political conflict over his ethical qualifications. He was previously the Governor of South Gyeongsang from 2004 to 2010.

Early life and career 
Kim was born in a farming family in Geochang, South Gyeongsang Province. He acquired his master's from Seoul National University in 1987 and his doctorate in education from the same university in 1992. In the late 1990s, he joined the predecessor of the ruling Grand National Party and was elected to the council of South Gyeongsang Province in 1998.

Governor 
In 2004, he was elected as the Governor of South Gyeongsang Province and in the local political community, he has long been mentioned as one of the strongest next-generation leaders. He was narrowly re-elected in 2006. His term expired in June 2010.

Prime minister nominee 
President Lee Myung-bak nominated 47-year-old Kim as the new prime minister. His nomination is subject to the National Assembly's confirmation hearing and requires its approval.  Gukhoe announced that Confirmation hearings on Kim's nomination will begin on Tuesday, 24 August. He has been the most controversial candidate in the confirmation hearing of all due to his background and previous accusations made again him, also admitted to ethical misconduct, including hiring a subordinate as his personal maid when serving as governor of South Gyeongsang Province and allowing his wife to use the car provided for official use. Assembly postponed confirmation vote on PM-designate because of his ethical qualifications. On 29 August, he offered to resign before confirmation vote.

National Assembly Seat 
On 27 Apr 2011, Kim won the April by elections for a National Assembly Seat representing Gimhae on the ruling party ticket by a narrow margin.

References 

Liberty Korea Party politicians
Seoul National University alumni
1962 births
Living people
Governors of South Gyeongsang Province
Members of the National Assembly (South Korea)
South Korean Buddhists